Glenea suturalis is a species of beetle in the family Cerambycidae. It was described by Karl Jordan in 1894. It is known from Indonesia.

Subspecies
 Glenea suturalis ruficauda Aurivillius, 1903
 Glenea suturalis suturalis Jordan, 1894

References

suturalis
Beetles described in 1894